is a town located in Tagawa District, Fukuoka Prefecture, Japan.

As of April 30, 2017, the town has an estimated population of 9,255 and a density of 1,200 persons per km². The total area is 8.04 km².

References

External links

 Itoda official website 

Towns in Fukuoka Prefecture